Maharashtra is an Indian state that was formed on 1 May 1960 with 26 initial districts. Since then, 11 additional districts have been created, the most recent of which is Palghar district. The state currently has 36 districts. These districts are grouped into six administrative divisions shown below.

Regions and Divisions

Maharashtra is divided into 36 districts, which are grouped into six divisions.

Regions
Geographically, historically, politically, and according to cultural sentiments, Maharashtra has five main regions:- 
 Konkan - (Konkan Division)
 Paschim Maharashtra also known as Desh - (Pune Division)
 North Maharashtra - (Nashik Division) - contains Khandesh
 Marathwada - (Aurangabad Division)
 Vidarbha - (Nagpur and Amravati divisions) - formerly Central Provinces and Berar

Divisions

Districts
The table below lists important geographic and demographic parameters for all 36 districts. Population data are extracted from the 2011 Census of India.

Proposed districts
In 2018, then Chief Minister Devendra Fadnavis constituted a committee under leadership of Chief secretary. The committee has proposed 22 new districts. Earlier in 2015, former ministers has demanded formation of new districts, they were Katol (Nagpur), Bramhapuri, Chimur (Chandrapur ), Pusad (Yavatmal), Khamgaon (Buldana), Achalpur (Amravati), Aheri (Gadchiroli) and Ashti (Wardha).

See also
Tehsils in Maharashtra

References

Census of India

 
Maharashtra-related lists
Maharashtra